Aghili or Aghily may refer to:
 Shadmehr Aghili (born 1973), Iranian singer
 Hadi Aghily (born 1981), Iranian footballer
 Aghili District, Gotvand County, Khuzestan Province, Iran
 Aghili-ye Jonubi Rural District, Aghili District
 Aghili-ye Shomali Rural District, Aghili District